Cyril Clairmonte Depeiaza (10 October 1928 – 10 November 1995) was a West Indian cricketer.

Depeiaza was born in Mount Standfast, Saint James Parish, Barbados. A wicketkeeper, he played in the Barbados Cricket League. He played first-class cricket for Barbados from 1951–52 to 1956–57, and toured New Zealand with the West Indian team in 1955–56. He played the last three Tests against Australia in 1954–55, and the first two against New Zealand in 1955–56. In the first Test of the New Zealand tour he did not keep wicket – Alfie Binns was preferred – and he bowled for the only time in his first-class career.

In a brief international Test career, he is best known for a world Test record 7th wicket partnership with Denis Atkinson of 347 in which he made his only first-class hundred of 122. The pair came together with the score at 147 for 6 in reply to Australia's first innings of 668. Their partnership record still stands.

During the partnership he was hit on the chest numerous times by short balls from Keith Miller and Ray Lindwall, leading to a suggestion from the father of his Barbados team-mate John Goddard that he wear a piece of protective foam rubber around his chest. This was the first known instance of a chest protector used in Test cricket. Following the innings, the crowd collected $1000 for him.

Nicknamed "The Leaning Tower of Depeiaza" because of the way he leaned forward in his defensive shots, Depeiaza worked as a customs clerk. He moved to England and played league and Minor Counties cricket in the 1960s and 1970s. He died in 1995 at Manchester, England.

References

Sources
 Sobers, G. (1988) Twenty Years at the Top, MacMillan London, .

External links

1928 births
1995 deaths
Barbados cricketers
Barbadian cricketers
West Indies Test cricketers
Northumberland cricketers
Wicket-keepers